Maryland Route 670 (MD 670) is a state highway in the U.S. state of Maryland.  Known as Lillian Street, the state highway runs  from MD 347 east to U.S. Route 50 (US 50) within Hebron in western Wicomico County.  MD 670 was constructed in the late 1930s.

Route description

MD 670 begins at an intersection with MD 347 (Main Street) in the town of Hebron.  The two-lane undivided state highway heads southeast through the town, then turns east after passing Chestnut Tree Road and leaves the town limits.  MD 670 continues east through farmland until its eastern terminus at US 50 (Ocean Gateway).  Traffic heading eastbound on MD 670 is required to turn onto US 50 east; US 50 west can be accessed via a crossover in the divided highway a short distance to the east.

History
MD 670 was under construction by 1936 and completed in 1939.  Direct access between eastbound MD 670 and westbound US 50 was removed in 2007.

Junction list

See also

References

External links

MDRoads: MD 670

670
Maryland Route 670